Page Kennedy (born November 23, 1976) is an American actor and rapper. In television, he is known for portraying Radon Randell in the Spike sports comedy series, Blue Mountain State, and "U-Turn" in the Showtime series, Weeds. He has also appeared in film, with roles in S.W.A.T. and The Meg. Outside of acting, Kennedy is active on social media, best known for being a popular Viner. On March 10, 2017 he released his first full length rap album titled Torn Pages featuring Royce Da 5'9, Crooked I, Trick Trick and more.

Early life and family
Kennedy was born Felton Eugene Kennedy II in Detroit, but grew up in Los Angeles with his mother until he was six years of age. He then moved back to Detroit to reunite with his father, who died after ten years.

Kennedy attended Western Michigan University (WMU), before transferring to the University of Delaware (UD), and majored in theatre and acting. Kennedy's father was a doctor and encouraged his son to study medicine, but Kennedy gained a passion for acting after being introduced to the works of William Shakespeare at WMU. Kennedy subsequently chose to attend UD after performing with high distinction at Western Michigan.

Career
Kennedy soon moved to Los Angeles and began to guest star on several shows including Six Feet Under, Blind Justice, Barbershop, Love, Inc., NYPD Blue, The Shield, Weeds and CSI: Crime Scene Investigation.

In 2005, Kennedy won a recurring role on the popular ABC primetime soap opera, Desperate Housewives where he played Caleb Applewhite, a fugitive who was being held captive in his mother Betty's (Alfre Woodard) basement. However shortly after in November 2005, Kennedy was fired from Desperate Housewives as the result of an internal investigation by the studio; Kennedy himself claimed that Touchstone Television, the producers of the show, wanted to take a new direction with the character and bought out his contract. He was replaced by NaShawn Kearse.

Kennedy joined the cast of Showtime's hit series Weeds during its second and third season. He played "U-Turn", a drug-dealer and self-described "thug".

Kennedy played Radon Randell, a quarterback starting over the main character, Alex Moran, in the Spike television series Blue Mountain State. Because Alex Moran does not want to start, he must keep Radon happy during the whole second season (the only season Radon was in). Radon's season ends in the championship game of his lone season when he aggravates a previous shoulder injury. Kennedy reprised his role in the 2016 feature-length film follow-up to the series.

Kennedy had a guest appearance whereas he played a burglar in the new 2013 TV series Legit. He also made an appearance in an episode of Robot Chicken as Kirby and Cal Zapata. Kennedy played a gay inmate and gang leader in My Name is Earl and a married inmate and ex-con in Raising the Bar. In 2016, he starred in the YouTube Red original show Rhett and Link's Buddy System.

Kennedy played Gerald, the cousin of main character James Carter, on the CBS show Rush Hour. He appeared in all episodes of the show before its cancellation in 2016. In 2018, he had a prominent role in the blockbuster film The Meg, alongside Jason Statham, Ruby Rose, and Rainn Wilson.

Filmography

Film

Television

Video Game

Web series

Discography

Studio albums
 Torn Pages (2017)
 Same Page, Different Story (2018)
 Page (2021)

Collaborative albums
 N-Idea (with Timothy Kennedy) (2017)

Mixtapes
 Straight Bars (2017)
 Straight Bars 2 (2018)
 Straight Bars III (2019)

References

External links

1976 births
African-American male actors
American male film actors
American male television actors
American male rappers
Living people
University of Delaware alumni
Western Michigan University alumni